Nguyễn Thị Hương Thủy, commonly known by her stage name Hương Thủy, is a Vietnamese-language singer from southern Vietnam known for ca dao and cải lương singing. She appears on the long running Vietnamese diaspora variety show Paris by Night, making her debut in Paris By Night 72: Tiếng Hát Từ Nhịp Tim. She also acts in their plays and musicals.

Biography
Hương Thủy was born in southern Vietnam and spent her childhood living in a pagoda in Vĩnh Long, Vietnam. Growing up, her dream was to become a singer. She was an outstanding contestant and was accepted to learn in Đại Học Sân Khấu Cải Lương và Hài Kịch in Saigon.

After graduating, she became a member of the "Tam Ca Phù Sa" band, then migrated to southern California, where she was introduced to Thúy Nga. Thúy Nga has successfully introduced her to the audience. She became famous as a Thúy Nga singer.

Hương Thủy first started her singing career in a female singing folk group named "Tam Ca Phù Sa". Prior to that, she had won several medals from singing and dancing competitions after she graduated from "Trường Đại Học Sân Khấu Cải Lương và Hài Kịch" in Saigon. After splitting from "Tam Ca Phù Sa", Hương Thủy then moved to South California under the sponsorship of her family. Through the introduction of a friend and the help of a demo CD, Hương Thủy was given the opportunity to audition for Thúy Nga Paris by Night, a top Vietnamese music production, where she landed a contract. It has been approximately seventeen years since her first appearance on Paris by Night 72 in her debut performance "Ca Dao". She has brought a variety of dances and singing techniques from various regions of Vietnam to the audience. Aside from her singing talent, Hương Thủy is an honest, kind-hearted, and respectful individual. She enjoys traditional food such as "Canh Mồng Tơi", or the more crunchy food such as "Taco Bell". Hương Thủy has a strong faith in Buddhism as she grew up living in a family temple located in Long Hồ, Vĩnh Long, Vietnam. She had learned not to take everything for granted as it was challenging for her parents to support her older brother and two younger brothers when she was little. 
 
Many people tend to wonder what a singer's day is like. For Hương Thủy, a typical day would consist of cooking in the early morning; doing work around the house; and most importantly, working on her music - such as recording at the studio, composing new songs, choreographing new dance moves, practicing her vocals, or just researching for new songs. Hương Thủy enjoys spending her time shopping for new outfits, as well as making a visit to a custom tailor shop. 
 
The effort that Hương Thủy puts into her music would allow her to have a stable position in the hearts of her fans, and would give her the opportunity to expand her fanbase by capturing the hearts of more people worldwide through her music. 
 
A life of a singer is never over until they leave this world; however, their music will remain. Therefore, Hương Thủy's goal is accomplishing the dream of having her musical contributions last in this world.

Trivia

Height: 1 '65 m (5' 5 ') 
 Family: Parents and  3 brothers 
 Favorite food: Rau mồng tơi nấu canh tép 
 Favorite song: Chuyện tình Lan và Điệp 1-2-3, Hạ buồn, Kiếp cầm ca, Ca dao, Ngẫu hứng ru con

Discography

CD album 
Vol. 1: Thương Nhớ Cậu Hai 

01. Thương nhớ cậu hai - Hương Thủy
02. Tân cổ: Phương trời xứ lạ - Hương Thủy, Mạnh Quỳnh
03. Hành trình trên đất phù sa - Hương Thủy, Tâm Đoan
04. Tân cổ: Ai khổ vì ai - Hương Thủy
05. Bẽ bàng bướm đậu mù u - Hương Thủy
06. Hồn quê - Hương Thủy
07. Vọng cổ: Lấy chồng xa - Hương Thủy
08. Nhà anh! Nhà em! - Hương Thủy, Quang Lê
09. Nhớ ai buông tiếng thở dài - Hương Thủy
10. Tân cổ: Đàn sáo Hậu Giang - Hương Thủy, Mạnh Quỳnh
11. Hoài niệm cố hương - Hương Thủy
12. Bonus VCD: Thương nhớ cậu hai - Hương Thủy

Vol.2: Thương Thầm 

01. Em về miệt thứ - Hương Thủy
02. Ngẫu hứng ru con - Hương Thủy
03. Vọng cổ: Mẹ vẫn đợi con về - Hương Thủy, Ngọc Đan Thanh
04. Bóng dáng mẹ hiền - Hương Thủy
05. Tân cổ: Ra giêng anh cưới em - Hương Thủy, Châu Thanh
06. Tân cổ: Cưới em - Hương Thủy, Mạnh Quỳnh
07. Thương thầm - Hương Thủy
08. Hoài cổ - Hương Thủy
09. Vọng cổ: Về quê ngoại - Hương Thủy
10. Tân cổ: Con đường mang tên em - Hương Thủy, Mạnh Quỳnh
11. Tân cổ: Qua lối nhỏ - Hương Thủy, Mạnh Quỳnh

Vol.3: Lý Lẽ Trái Tim 

01. Ngợi ca quê hương em - Hương Thủy
02. Trên dòng sông nhỏ - Hương Thủy
03. Sầu tím thiệp hồng - Hương Thủy, Mai Quốc Huy
04. Nếu hai đứa mình - Hương Thủy
05. Lời cuối cho cuộc tình - Hương Thủy, Thế Sơn
06. Đời không như là mơ - Hương Thủy
07. Tân cổ: Thương quá Việt Nam - Hương Thủy, Châu Thanh
08. Chiều hạ vàng - Hương Thủy
09. Lý lẽ trái tim - Hương Thủy, Duy Trường
10. Về quê cưới em - Hương Thủy, Thế Sơn
11. Mẹ tôi - Hương Thủy
12. Tân cổ: Bạc trắng lửa hồng - Hương Thủy, Mạnh Quỳnh

Vol.4: Chuyện Người Con Gái 

01. Bến sông chờ - Hương Thủy
02. Chiếc xuồng - Hương Thủy, Quang Lê
03. Chuyện người con gái - Hương Thủy
04. Con đò lỡ hẹn - Hương Thủy
05. Đò dọc - Hương Thủy, Mai Thiên Vân
06. Công ơn cha mẹ - Hương Thủy
07. Tân cổ: Quán gấm đầu làng - Hương Thủy, Thế Sơn
08. Trở lại Bạc Liêu - Hương Thủy
09. Gió về miền xuôi - Hương Thủy
10. Sóc sờ bai Sóc Trăng - Hương Thủy
11. Tâm sự đời tôi - Hương Thủy
12. Lý quạ kêu - Hương Thủy
13. Về quê - Hương Thủy
14. Liên khúc: Mẹ từ bi, Chùa tôi - Hương Thủy, Kỳ Phương Uyên

Vol.5: Lời Người Viễn Xứ 

1. Lời Người Viễn Xứ

2. Cơn Mê Tình Ái

3. Áo Mới Cà Mau

4. Xác Pháo Nhà Ai

5. Trăng Về Thôn Dã

6. Sao Chưa Thấy Hồi Âm

7. Vọng Cổ Buồn

8. Chiều Tây Đô

9. Bông Điên Điển

10. Miền Tây Quê Tôi

Songs
Bẽ bàng bướm đậu mù u - Hương Thủy
Bến sông chờ - Hương Thủy
Bóng dáng mẹ hiền - Hương Thủy
Ca dao - Hương Thủy
Cánh thiệp đầu xuân - Hương Thủy
Chiếc xuồng - Hương Thủy, Quang Lê
Chiều hạ vàng - Hương Thủy
Chùa tôi - Hương Thủy
Chuyến bay hạnh phúc - Hương Thuỷ, Lưu Bích, Bảo Hân, Tú Quyên, Thuỷ Tiên, Nguyệt Anh, Như Quỳnh, Như Loan, Hồ Lệ Thu, Ngọc Anh, Quỳnh Vy, Minh Tuyết
Chuyện người con gái - Hương Thủy
Chuyện tình nơi làng quê - Hương Thủy, Quang Lê
Con đò lỡ hẹn - Hương Thủy
Công ơn cha mẹ - Hương Thủy
Diệu Pháp Âm - Hương Thủy
Đêm giao thừa nghe một khúc dân ca - Hương Thủy
Đoàn người lữ thứ - Thế Sơn, Trần Thái Hòa, Lương Tùng Quang, Dương Triệu Vũ, Trịnh Lam, Huy Tâm, Tâm Đoan, Hương Thủy, Ngọc Liên, Ngọc Loan, Quỳnh Vi, Hương Giang
Đò dọc - Hương Thủy, Mai Thiên Vân
Đoạn cuối cho cuộc tình - Hương Thủy, Thế Sơn
Đoản xuân ca - Hương Thủy
Đời không như là mơ - Hương Thủy
Em đi trên cỏ non - Hương Thủy, Hà Phương
Em về miệt thứ - Hương Thủy
Gió về miền xuôi - Hương Thủy
Hành trình trên đất phù sa - Hương Thủy, Tâm Đoan
Hoa bất diệt - Hương Thủy, Quang Lê
Hoài cổ - Hương Thủy
Hoài niệm cố hương - Hương Thủy
Hồn quê - Hương Thủy
Họp mặt lần cuối - Hương Thủy
Hương đồng gió nội - Hương Thủy, Như Loan, Bảo Hân
Khát vọng xưa - Hương Thủy
Lạy Phật Quan Âm - Hương Thủy
Liên khúc Chồng xa - Hương Thủy, Như Quỳnh, Tâm Đoan, Quang Lê
Liên khúc Có nhớ đêm nào, Xuân yêu thương, Amor amor - Hương Thủy, Kỳ Duyên, Mai Tiến Dũng
Liên khúc Ghé bến Sài Gòn, Sài Gòn - Hương Thủy, Như Quỳnh, Bảo Hân, Loan Châu, Minh Tuyết, Tâm Đoan, Hồ Lệ Thu, Như Loan
Liên khúc Lính - Hương Thủy, Mạnh Quỳnh, Mai Quốc Huy
Liên khúc Lý quạ kêu, Dệt tầm gai - Hương Thủy, Trần Thu Hà
Liên khúc Mẹ trùng dương, Mẹ Việt Nam ơi!, Cô gái Việt - Ý Lan, Khánh Ly, Họa Mi, Khánh Hà, Hoàng Oanh, Minh Tuyết, Ngọc Liên, Tú Quyên, Thanh Trúc, Như Loan, Bảo Hân, Hồ Lệ Thu, Quỳnh Vi, Hương Giang, Loan Châu, Hương Thủy, Tâm Đoan
Liên khúc Mẹ từ bi, Chùa tôi - Hương Thủy, Kỳ Phương Uyên
Liên khúc Mời anh về thăm quê em, Sóc sờ bai Sóc Trăng - Hà Phương, Hương Thủy
Liên khúc Nắng đẹp miền Nam, Khúc ca ngày mùa - Hà Phương, Hương Thủy
Liên khúc Nhạt nắng, Biển nhớ - Hương Thủy, Minh Tuyết, Tú Quyên, Quỳnh Vi, Trúc Lâm, Trúc Linh, Ngọc Liên, Như Loan, Bảo Hân, Thùy Vân, Hồ Lệ Thu, Thanh Hà, Nguyệt Anh, Lynda Trang Đài
Liên khúc Trăng về thôn dã, Rước tình về với quê hương - Hương Thủy, Thế Sơn
Lý lẽ trái tim - Hương Thủy
Lý quạ kêu - Hương Thủy
Mẹ tôi - Hương Thủy
Mẹ từ bi - Quang Lê, Hương Thủy
Nào biết nào hay - Hương Thủy
Nếu hai đứa mình - Hương Thủy
Ngày hạnh phúc - Hương Thủy, Tâm Đoan, Minh Tuyết, Ngọc Liên
Ngẫu hứng ru con - Hương Thủy
Ngoại yêu - Hương Thủy
Ngợi ca quê hương em - Hương Thủy
Nhà anh nhà em - Hương Thủy, Quang Lê
Nhạc cảnh Bà mẹ quê, Lòng mẹ Việt Nam, Lời dặn dò của mẹ - Tâm Đoan, Hương Thủy, Thanh Trúc, Michelle Nguyễn, Quang Lê, Khánh Ly, Thế Sơn
Nhạc cảnh Con đường cái quan Vào miền Nam - Hương Thủy, Thế Sơn, Quang Lê, Lưu Việt Hùng, Nguyễn Hoàng Nam
Nhớ ai buông tiếng thở dài - Hương Thủy
Rừng lá thay chưa - Hương Thủy, Mạnh Quỳnh
Rừng xưa - Hương Thủy
Sao em nỡ vội lấy chồng - Hương Thủy, Như Quỳnh, Minh Tuyết, Ngọc Liên, Loan Châu, Thanh Trúc, Tú Quyên, Hà Phương
Sài Gòn em nhớ ai - Hương Thủy, Duy Trường
Sầu tím thiệp hồng - Hương Thủy, Mai Quốc Huy
Sóc sờ bai Sóc Trăng - Hương Thủy
Tâm sự đời tôi - Hương Thủy
Tân cổ Ai khổ vì ai - Hương Thủy
Tân cổ Bạc trắng lửa hồng - Hương Thủy, Mạnh Quỳnh
Tân cổ Chuyện tình đồi thông hai mộ 2 - Hương Thủy, Vũ Luân
Tân cổ Con đường mang tên em - Hương Thủy, Mạnh Quỳnh
Tân cổ Cưới em - Hương Thủy, Mạnh Quỳnh
Tân cổ Đàn sáo Hậu Giang - Hương Thủy, Mạnh Quỳnh
Tân cổ Đoạn cuối tình yêu - Hương Thủy, Vũ Luân
Tân cổ Được tin em lấy chồng - Hương Thủy, Nguyễn Kha
Tân cổ Hình bóng quê nhà - Hương Thủy, Mạnh Quỳnh
Tân cổ Hoa bất diệt - Hương Thủy
Tân cổ Kiếp tình chung - Hương Thủy, Mạnh Quỳnh
Tân cổ Lưu bút ngày xanh - Hương Thủy - Quốc Kiệt
Tân cổ Mai em sang ngang - Hương Thủy, Chiêu Hùng
Tân cổ Mẹ là quê hương - Hương Thủy, Vũ Luân
Tân cổ Mưa bụi 2 - Hương Thủy, Lương Tuấn
Tân cổ Nhành cây trứng cá - Hương Thủy, Vũ Luân
Tân cổ Phải em lý ngựa ô - Hương Thủy, Mạnh Quỳnh
Tân cổ Phương trời xứ lạ - Hương Thủy, Mạnh Quỳnh
Tân cổ Qua lối nhỏ - Hương Thủy, Mạnh Quỳnh
Tân cổ Quán gấm đầu làng - Hương Thủy, Thế Sơn
Tân cổ Ra giêng anh cưới em - Hương Thủy, Châu Thanh
Tân cổ Tâm sự người cha - Hương Thủy, Quốc Kiệt
Tân cổ Thiêng liêng tình mẹ - Hương Thủy, Hương Lan
Tân cổ Thuyền hoa - Hương Thủy, Kim Tiểu Long
Tân cổ Thương quá Việt Nam - Hương Thủy, Châu Thanh
Tân cổ Tình nhỏ mau quên - Hương Thủy, Vũ Luân
Tân cổ Trăng hờn tủi - Hương Thủy, Kim Tiểu Long
Thị trấn mù sương - Hương Thủy
Thương chị - Hương Thủy, Hà Phương
Thương nhớ cậu hai - Hương Thủy
Thương thầm - Hương Thủy
Tình nhỏ mau quên - Hương Thủy, Quang Lê
Trên dòng sông nhỏ - Hương Thủy
Trở lại Bạc Liêu - Hương Thủy
Tự tình lý cây bông - Hương Thủy, Duy Trường
Về quê - Hương Thủy
Về quê cưới em - Hương Thủy, Thế Sơn
Vọng cổ Lấy chồng xa - Hương Thủy
Vọng cổ Mẹ vẫn đợi con về - Hương Thủy, Ngọc Đan Thanh
Vọng cổ Thiếu phụ Nam Xương - Hương Thủy, Mạnh Quỳnh
Vọng cổ Tình xuân - Hương Thủy
Vọng cổ Về quê ngoại - Hương Thủy
Vọng cổ Ý nghĩa vu lan - Hương Thủy, Duy Trường

References 

1974 births
Living people
21st-century Vietnamese women singers
Vietnamese emigrants to the United States
People from Vĩnh Long province